Vedrare Nunatak (‘Nunatak Vedrare’ \'nu-na-tak ve-'dra-re\) is the rocky peak rising to 798 m in eastern Desudava Glacier on Nordenskjöld Coast in Graham Land, Antarctica.

The feature is named after the settlement of Vedrare in southern Bulgaria.

Location
British mapping in 1978.

Maps
 Antarctic Digital Database (ADD). Scale 1:250000 topographic map of Antarctica. Scientific Committee on Antarctic Research (SCAR). Since 1993, regularly upgraded and updated.

Notes

References
 Vedrare Nunatak. SCAR Composite Antarctic Gazetteer.
 Bulgarian Antarctic Gazetteer. Antarctic Place-names Commission. (details in Bulgarian, basic data in English)

External links
 Vedrare Nunatak. Copernix satellite image

Nunataks of Graham Land
Nordenskjöld Coast
Bulgaria and the Antarctic